It Takes a Lunatic is a 2019 documentary film directed by Billy Lyons, Kim Ferraro and Seth Isler and starring Alec Baldwin, André Bishop and Michael Douglas. The premise revolves around Wynn Handman, the Artistic Director of The American Place Theatre.

Cast 
 Alec Baldwin
 André Bishop
 Michael Douglas
 Richard Gere
 Connie Britton
 Susan Lucci
 Eric Bogosian
 Kathleen Chalfant
 John Leguizamo
 Frank Chin
 James Caan
 Chris Cooper
 Joel Grey
 Marianne Leone
 Clare Coss
 Sam Shepard

Release
It Takes a Lunatic premiered at the 2019 Tribeca Film Festival, and was released on October 25, 2019, on Netflix.

References

External links
 
 

2019 documentary films
2019 films
2010s English-language films